Vall d'Albaida is a comarca in the province of Valencia, Valencian Community, Spain.

Reconquered by the Aragonese king James I of Aragon in the first half of the 13th century it was heavily populated by Muslims until the Expulsion of the Moriscos from the Kingdom of Valencia in 1609.

Etymology 
The name of the comarca is derived from the Hispano-Arabic word albáyḍa, which in turn is derived from the classical Arabic البيضاء (al-bayḍāʾ, "The white one" – reference to the white chalk land of the comarca), from which the yellow flowering plant native to the comarca gets its common name Anthyllis cystoides.

Geography 
Lying approximately 70 km south of the city of Valencia  and covering an area of some 722 square kilometers, Vall d'Albaida borders on the north with the comarca of Costera, to the east with Safor, to the south with Comtat and Alcoià, and to the west with Alto Vinalopó, the latter three of which belong to the province of Alicante.

The River Albaida runs through the comarca from south to north.

Climate 
The area enjoys a typically Mediterranean climate, characterised by hot summers and relatively cold winters, with an average of two snowfalls per year.

Population 

Vall d'Albaida has a population of around 90,000 inhabitants (2008).

Municipalities

The Vall d'Albaida comarca is composed of 34 municipalities.

Culture

Route of the Monasteries of Valencia 

The Route of the Monasteries of Valencia (GR-236) is a monumental and cultural route that connects five monasteries located in the south of the Province of Valencia.

Of the four different itineraries available, three (by foot, by Mountain bike and on horseback) cross various comarques within Vall d'Albaida, following signposted riding trails, mountain trails, old roads and railroad tracks, and include the Monastery of the Corpus Christi and Xio Castle, both in the municipality of Llutxent.

By foot, the route takes approximately 3–4 days.

The Route was inaugurated in 2008.

See also 
 Comarques of the Valencian Community
 Commonwealth of Municipalities of the Vall d'Albaida

References

http://palomatorrijos.blogspot.com/2009/12/los-marqueses-de-albaida-pleito-por-el.html
http://palomatorrijos.blogspot.com/2009/12/los-marqueses-de-albaida-valencia.html
 Amelias GOMEZ MARTINEZ:  "Propiedad señorial en el marquesado de Albaida perspectivas socieconómicas del señorío en la segunda mitad del s. XVIII". Published 1988 by Excmo. Ayuntamiento de Albaida in [Albaida] . 1988. 288 pages. Library of Congress HD779.A375 G66.

External links
Comparsa Saudites d'Ontinyent  (in English) (en valencià) (en español)
La Vall d’Albaida (in Valencian and Spanish)
Mancomunitat de Municipis de la Vall d'Albaida (in Valencian and Spanish)

 
Comarques of the Valencian Community
Geography of the Province of Valencia